The men's team épée was one of eight fencing events on the fencing at the 1992 Summer Olympics programme. It was the nineteenth appearance of the event. The competition was held from 5 to 6 August 1992. 60 fencers from 12 nations competed.

Results

Round One

Pool A

Pool B

Pool C

Pool D

Final Round

Rosters

Canada
 Jean-Marc Chouinard
 Alain Côté
 Allan Francis
 Danek Nowosielski
 Laurie Shong

Czechoslovakia
 Aleš Depta
 Jiří Douba
 Roman Ječmínek
 Michal Franc
 Tomáš Kubíček

France
 Éric Srecki
 Jean-Michel Henry
 Olivier Lenglet
 Jean-François Di Martino
 Robert Leroux

Germany
 Elmar Borrmann
 Robert Felisiak
 Arnd Schmitt
 Uwe Proske
 Wladimir Resnitschenko

Hungary
 Iván Kovács
 Krisztián Kulcsár
 Ferenc Hegedűs
 Ernő Kolczonay
 Gábor Totola

Italy
 Sandro Cuomo
 Angelo Mazzoni
 Stefano Pantano
 Maurizio Randazzo
 Sandro Resegotti

Poland
 Sławomir Nawrocki
 Maciej Ciszewski
 Witold Gadomski
 Marek Stępień
 Sławomir Zwierzyński

Romania
 Adrian Pop
 Gabriel Pantelimon
 Cornel Milan
 Gheorghe Epurescu
 Nicolae Mihăilescu

South Korea
 Lee Sang-Gi
 Jang Tae-Seok
 Kim Jeong-Gwan
 Gu Gyo-Dong
 Lee Sang-Yeop

Spain
 Fernando de la Peña
 Ángel Fernández
 César González
 Raúl Maroto
 Manuel Pereira

Sweden
 Mats Ahlgren
 Jerri Bergström
 Thomas Lundblad
 Ulf Sandegren
 Péter Vánky

Unified Team
 Pavel Kolobkov
 Andrey Shuvalov
 Serhiy Kravchuk
 Sergey Kostarev
 Valery Zakharevich

References

Fencing at the 1992 Summer Olympics
Men's events at the 1992 Summer Olympics